This article lists events that occurred during 1984 in Soviet Estonia.

Incumbents

Events
8–15 July – IV Global Estonian Cultural Days were taken place in Toronto, Canada.

Births

Deaths

See also
 1984 in Estonian television

References

 
1980s in Estonia
Estonia
Estonia
Years of the 20th century in Estonia